John Glassford is a former award-winning linebacker in the Canadian Football League playing 6 seasons with the Ottawa Rough Riders.

A graduate of Wilfrid Laurier University, Glassford played on the Golden Hawks' Yates Cup winning team in 1973. He joined Ottawa in 1977 and played 96 games, never missing a regular season game. In 1981 he played in the classic Grey Cup game, a Rider last second loss to the Edmonton Eskimos and was named Grey Cup Most Valuable Player. In 1981 he had one QB sack, a pass reception for 5 yards and a 2-point convert. He intercepted 2 passes in 1982.

He was inducted into the Wilfrid Laurier University Golden Hawk Hall of Fame in 1991. He now owns Glassford Chrysler in Ingersoll, Ontario.

References

1953 births
Living people
Ottawa Rough Riders players
Wilfrid Laurier Golden Hawks football players
People from Ingersoll, Ontario
Players of Canadian football from Ontario